Chinatown is an ethnic enclave in the Central Business District (CBD) of Melbourne, Victoria, Australia. Centred at the eastern end of Little Bourke Street, it extends between the corners of Swanston and Spring streets, and consists of numerous laneways, alleys and arcades. Established in the 1850s during the Victorian gold rush, it is notable for being the longest continuous Chinese settlement in the Western World and the oldest Chinatown in the Southern Hemisphere.
	
Melbourne's Chinatown has played an important role in establishing the culture of Chinese immigrants in Australia, and is still home to many Chinese restaurants, cultural venues, businesses and places of worship. Today, Melbourne's Chinatown is a major tourist attraction, known for its architectural heritage, annual festivals and cuisines of Asian origins, as well as its karaoke venues, bars and fashion boutiques.

Beyond Chinatown and the CBD, Melbourne's Chinese community is well-represented in other areas of the city, most notably Box Hill, where a $450 million development named "New Chinatown" is currently being constructed.

Chinatown is home to the Chinese Museum.

History

Gold rush beginnings and colonial era (1850s–1890s)

The advent of the Victorian gold rush in 1851 attracted immigrants from around the world, including tens of thousands of Chinese prospectors. The majority were Cantonese-speaking male villagers from Hong Kong and nearby areas, including the southwestern districts of Guangdong (See Yup), and its capital city Guangzhou (Sam Yap). The eastern half of Little Bourke Street was considered convenient for these immigrants, as both a staging post and a place to pick up supplies en route to the goldfields in central Victoria. The earliest lodging houses were established in Celestial Avenue, off Little Bourke Street, and by 1855, Chinese houses and businesses lined the majority of Little Bourke Street from Elizabeth to Russell streets.

It is notable for being the oldest Chinatown in the Southern Hemisphere, and the longest continuous Chinese settlement outside Asia, owing to San Francisco's Chinatown's relocation following the 1906 earthquake. The Victorian gold rush eventually waned, causing a shift from rural living and an influx of people migrating into metropolitan Melbourne, particularly Little Bourke Street, which already had a predominantly Chinese population.

The residents of Chinatown established themselves as storekeepers, importers, furniture-makers, herbalists and in the wholesale fruit and vegetable industries, with a strong presence at the nearby Eastern Market on Bourke Street. Christian churches were built and Chinese political groups and newspapers were subsequently formed. Other members of the Chinese community who lived and worked elsewhere used Chinatown to congregate with friends. The area also provided further support to new Chinese immigrants.

Early in its history, Chinatown developed a reputation for "salubrious" enterprises including opium dens, gambling houses and brothels, but maintained a distinctly "entrepreneurial air". By 1859, Victoria's Chinese population reached approximately 45,000, representing nearly 8.5% of the colony's total population.

Australian colonial author Marcus Clarke wrote in 1869:

Despite the cultural divide, several community leaders with strong Chinatown connections became influential and well-regarded among Melburnians more broadly, including businessman Lowe Kong Meng and missionary Cheok Hong Cheong. Also during the colonial period, several businesses run by Australians of European descent were based in Chinatown, including the offices of Table Talk, for a time in the 1880s one of Melbourne's most popular magazines.

Federation, population decline and revival (1901–present day)

Chinatown peaked in the early 20th century in terms of population and activity, which was hampered by the Immigration Restriction Act, implemented after the federation of Australia in 1901. Chinatown's subsequent decline was further exacerbated by a general shift of businesses and residents from Melbourne's central business district (CBD) to the surrounding suburbs.

Melburnians of European descent, including University students, began frequenting Chinatown eateries in the 1920s, leading to the mainstream popularity of Australian Chinese cuisine by the mid-20th century. The dim sim, a staple of Australian Chinese cuisine, was invented in Chinatown by William Wing Young, in 1945, at his restaurant Wing Lee, and has become a major snack food in takeaway outlets and supermarkets throughout the country. Young's daughter, Elizabeth Chong, became a television celebrity chef and Chinatown tour guide. Chinatown's potential as a tourist site was recognised in the 1960s by local entrepreneur and politician David Wang, whose push for the redevelopment of Little Bourke Street led to the archways of today.

People from Southern China, who settled in Melbourne, brought their Cantonese cuisine to Australia, although recently, Northern Chinese cuisine has made more of an appearance. Cantonese food was the first international cuisine to become popular as a take away food in Australia. The 1960s and 1970s saw the eradication of the White Australia policy, which led to greater immigration from Indochina, Singapore, Malaysia, Taiwan, Hong Kong and the People's Republic of China. In 2010, the ground floor of the Chinese Museum was remodelled as a visitor centre for Melbourne's Chinatown. In 2011, a memorial statue of Dr Sun Yat-sen was unveiled outside the Museum's entrance, in celebration of the 100th anniversary of the founding of the Republic of China. The traditional Chinese New Year Lion Dance has always ended at this spot, but will now end with a blessing of the statue.

Culture

Chinese New Year
The Chinese New Year is primarily celebrated in Chinatown on the first Sunday of the new Lunar year. It is the original and primary location of Melbourne's CNY festival, although the festival has expanded to multiple CBD sites in recent years, including Crown Casino. The celebrations feature traditional and contemporary Chinese cultural activities and festivities, dances, Chinese opera and singing, karaoke competition, numerous stalls of culinary delights, arts and crafts, Chinese chess competitions, calligraphy and children's events.

The Dai Loong Dragon Parade, as well as the main Lion Dances (performed by the Chinese Youth Society of Melbourne, Chinese Masonic Society and Hung Gar Martial Arts School) begin at roughly 10am on the Sunday following New Year, and run till roughly 4pm. The Dragon parade begins and ends at Melbourne's Chinese Museum.

Asian Food Festival

The Asian food festival is typically held in Spring and celebrates Asian cuisine with food tasting, stalls, cooking demonstrations, among others.

Other Chinese communities 
Beyond the original Chinatown in the CBD, several newer Chinese communities have developed in Melbourne's eastern suburbs, such as Box Hill, Glen Waverley and Springvale.

An older community, with links back to the 1850s gold rush, is to be found in the regional city of Bendigo, 150 km north-west of Melbourne.

Cultural depictions
Tom Roberts, one of the leading figures of Australian Impressionism, created sketches of life in Little Bourke Street in the 1880s. During the Second World War, modernist Eric Thake created a series of works depicting Chinatown shopfronts, which now belong in the State Library of Victoria's painting collection.

Fergus Hume's The Mystery of a Hansom Cab (1886), one of the most famous mystery crime novels of the Victorian era, is based largely on the author's observations of life in Little Bourke Street, including the "dark recesses" of the Chinese Quarter, where Detective Kilsip, the novel's protagonist, pursues his suspect. Alfred Dampier's Marvellous Melbourne play of the same year features a scene in a Chinatown opium den.

Between 1909 and 1910, Melbourne's first Chinese-language newspaper, the Chinese Times, serialised Wong Shee Ping's novel The Poison of Polygamy, the first novel written in Literary Chinese to be published in Australia and possibly the West. Set in Victoria during the 1850s gold rush, the novel describes life in Chinatown.

Set in Little Bourke Street, Elinor Mordaunt's 1919 novel The Ginger Jar is about a love affair between a Chinese Australian hawker and a European woman.

A pivotal scene of the 1911 silent film The Double Event, directed by W. J. Lincoln, takes place in Melbourne's Chinatown.

The 1997 Hong Kong action film Mr. Nice Guy, starring Jackie Chan, is set in Melbourne, with several scenes shot in Chinatown.

Heritage sites

Archways

Buildings

Landmarks

See also 
 Heavenly Queen Temple (Melbourne)
 Chinese Museum, Melbourne

References

External links 

 Chinese Museum Museum of Chinese Australian History.
 Chinatown Precinct Association website

Melbourne City Centre

Melbourne
Culture of Melbourne
Landmarks in Melbourne
1851 establishments in Australia
Tourist attractions in Melbourne